My 600-lb Life is an American reality television series that has aired on the TLC  television network since 2012. Each episode follows a year in the life of morbidly obese individuals, who usually begin the episode weighing at least , and documents their attempts to reduce their weight to a healthy level. Update episodes, called "Where Are They Now?", feature one or more previous patients, picking up a year or more after their original episodes aired.

Patients are placed under the care of Houston surgeon Younan Nowzaradan (often referred to as "Dr. Now"), who first has them attempt losing weight on their own by following a strict diet, and then depending on the patient's progress may offer gastric bypass surgery or sleeve gastrectomy to further assist in weight loss.

Concept
This series was originally a five-part miniseries involving four morbidly obese patients. Because of its popularity, new episodes were filmed, including a "Where Are They Now?" retrospective in Season 4 that follows up on previous patients to track their weight-loss journey months or years after bariatric surgery.

In Season 1, patients were filmed over seven years (2004–2011). Beginning with Season 2, patients were filmed for only one year. In Season 8, certain patients' stories were filmed for only six months.

Beginning with Season 5, new episodes were two hours long instead of one hour. This was previously done with "Melissa's Story" (which was in two parts) and "Lupe's Story". Recap episodes titled "Supersized" and "Extended", which include additional facts and footage respectively, also aired during this season.

Subject outcomes
Thirteen patients have died since appearing on the show.

 Henry Foots, who was featured in season one of the show, died of an illness unrelated to his weight on May 16, 2013.
 Sean Milliken, who was chronicled on the fourth season of the show, died on February 17, 2019, from cardiac arrest due to an infection from poor hygiene, after having gained over 150 lbs during the previous four weeks. He was 29 years old.
 James King, a participant in the show's fifth season, died on April 3, 2020, from multiple organ failure due to his obesity at age 49.
 James "LB" Bonner, who was featured on the sixth season of the show, committed suicide on August 2, 2018, at the age of 30.
 Lisa Fleming, also a sixth season participant, died of an undisclosed illness on August 23, 2018, which was unrelated to her weight, at the age of 50.
 Rob Buchel, also featured in season six, suffered a fatal heart attack on November 15, 2017, during the filming of the show, while staying in a skilled nursing facility in Houston. Buchel's death was the first during the patient's respective episode. Buchel was 41 years old at the time of his death.
 Kelly Mason, a participant in the show's seventh season, died on February 15, 2019, from heart failure at the age of 41. Mason's death was the second in the series to be featured during the patient's respective episode.
 Coliesa McMillian, featured on the show's eighth season, died on September 22, 2020, after being treated in ICU for two weeks due to acute kidney failure and other complications related to weight loss surgery. She was 41 years old.
 Renee Biran, featured on the show's sixth season, died on May 14, 2021. She was 56 years old.
Gina Krasley, featured on the show's eighth season, died on August 1, 2021. She was 30 years old.
Ashley Randall, featured on the show's first season, died of sepsis, complications related to sepsis, and pneumonia on October 2, 2021. She was 40 years old.
 Laura Ann Perez, featured on the show’s third season, died on November 17, 2021. She was 48 years old.
 Destinee LaShaee, the first openly transgender person on the show who appeared in the show's seventh season, died on February 8, 2022, at the age of 31. Although the cause of death was not revealed, LaShaee and her family had stated that she struggled with depression and suicidal ideation.

Spin-offs
Beginning in January 2015, TLC began airing My 600-lb Life: Where Are They Now?. The purpose of this spin-off was to update viewers on the weight loss journeys of people featured in previous seasons. As of 2021, seven seasons of the Where Are They Now? follow-ups have aired.

In 2016, a second spin-off, Skin Tight, began airing, showing people who struggle with the excess skin remaining after their weight loss successes. Dr. Nowzaradan appears along with other plastic surgeons.

Failed lawsuits 
In 2018 several news outlets reported that several former patients of Dr. Nowzaradan who appeared in the series, and the family of one patient, LB Bonner, who died by suicide, had brought suit against the show's production company, Megalomedia, alleging negligence and claiming that the company failed to cover medical costs. Plaintiff Destinee LaShaee, the first transgender participant to appear on the show, sued the show after claiming it did not provide the mental health treatments it promised. She died on February 8, 2022, after posting messages on social media "indicative of her depression and possibly suicidal thoughts."

A total of ten lawsuits were filed, which were later consolidated into a single proceeding on May 20, 2020. Megalomedia requested summary judgment, which was denied via the judge not ruling on their motion within the time required under Texas law. Megalomedia then appealed their motion to the Appellate court.

On April 14, 2022, all ten of the lawsuits were dismissed by the 13th Appellate Court of Texas.

Series overview

Subject statistics

References

External links 
 
 

2012 American television series debuts
2010s American reality television series
2020s American reality television series
English-language television shows
Obesity in television
Obesity in the United States
Television shows set in Houston
TLC (TV network) original programming